Okpokwu is a Local Government Area of Benue State, Nigeria. Its headquarters are in the town of Okpoga located in the south of the area. 
Benue State Polytechnic is located in the town of Ugbokolo in this LGA.
 
It has an area of 731 km and a population of 176,647 at the 2006 census.

The postal code of the area is 973.

Education
Okpokwu is home to the Benue State Polytechnic and New Vision Institute of Technology Ekenobi

References

The local Government has twelve council wards namely:- Ameju, Eke, Ichama1, Ichama11,  Ingle-Okpale, Ojigo, Okonobo, Okpoga Central,  Okpoga North, Okpoga South,  Okpoga West and Ugbokolo.

Local Government Areas in Benue State